Marpessa Dawn (January 3, 1934 – August 25, 2008), also known as Gypsy Marpessa Dawn Menor, was an American-born French actress, as well as a singer and dancer.  She is best remembered for her role in the film Black Orpheus (1959).

Biography

Born on a farm near Pittsburgh, Pennsylvania, of African-American and Filipino heritage, she worked as a laboratory technician in New York before migrating to Europe as a teenager.

She began acting in England, with some minor TV roles. Then, in 1953, she relocated to France and while occasionally working as a governess also sang and danced in nightclubs, where she met director Marcel Camus. At the age of 24 she won the role of "Eurydice" in his film Black Orpheus. The film won the Palme d'Or at the 1959 Cannes Film Festival and the 1960 Academy Award for Best Foreign Language Film. She married Camus, but divorced him soon after and married Belgian actor Georges-Eric Vander-Elst, whom she met when they appeared together in a play at the American Centre in Paris. They had a civil ceremony held in secrecy. Considered a great beauty, she was featured in November 1959 by Ebony and has been hailed as "one of Ebony magazine's prettiest cover girls, along with the likes of Dorothy Dandridge, Halle Berry, Vanessa A. Williams and Lena Horne".

Dawn remained in Europe, working in French films and television. She also had several theatrical parts, including a starring role in Chérie Noire, a highly successful stage comedy which played for seven years, touring France, Belgium, Switzerland, Tunisia, Algeria and Morocco, and Le Jardin des délices (The Garden of Delights), by Fernando Arrabal, with Delphine Seyrig, 1969. Her subsequent career, however, was much less successful. She appeared in a 2005 documentary about Vinicius de Moraes, who wrote the original play from which Black Orpheus was adapted. She and her fellow lead from that film, Brazilian actor Breno Mello, died just 45 days apart in 2008, both from heart attacks. She was 74 years old at the time of her death in Paris and left five children and four grandchildren.

Filmography

References

External links

The New York Times Obituary.
Marpessa Dawn, The Fashion Spot.

1934 births
2008 deaths
Actresses from Pittsburgh
American expatriate actresses in France
American film actresses
American television actresses
African-American actresses
American actresses of Filipino descent
Burials at Père Lachaise Cemetery
20th-century American actresses
20th-century African-American women
20th-century African-American people
21st-century African-American people
21st-century African-American women